Titanium oxide may refer to:
 Titanium dioxide (titanium(IV) oxide), TiO2
 Titanium(II) oxide (titanium monoxide), TiO, a non-stoichiometric oxide
 Titanium(III) oxide (dititanium trioxide), Ti2O3
 Ti3O
 Ti2O
 δ-TiOx (x= 0.68–0.75)
  TinO2n−1 where n ranges from 3–9 inclusive, e.g. Ti3O5, Ti4O7, etc.

Uses

Often used as an active ingredient in sunscreens combined with oxybenzone and octyl methoxycinnamate.

Used to give the white colour of titanium white paint.

References

Dielectrics
Electronic engineering
High-κ dielectrics